Abunidazole (INN) is a nitroimidazole antifungal medication. It was named in 1984 but apparently never marketed.

References

Secondary alcohols
Imidazole antifungals
Nitroimidazoles
Phenols
Tert-butyl compounds